For Marcia Hines album of the same name, see Right Here and Now (Marcia Hines album). 

Right Here and Now is the third album by American singer/songwriter Owen Temple. It was released in 2002 on El Paisano Records.

Track listing
All songs (Temple) except where noted
“Accidentally Break My Heart” - 2:57
“Burning Too Hot to Last” - 2:58
“Little Sweet Loss” - 3:31
“This Ain't Las Vegas” - 3:48
“No Daring Is Fatal” - 3:24
“Move Around Money” - 3:36
“For Old Times' Sake” - 3:14
“Before the Night Becomes the Dawn” - 4:59
“Trouble With You” - 3:06
“The Madder You Are (The Cuter You Get) ” - 4:15
“Faith Without Works” - 2:49
“That's Not Something I Could Do” - 4:49

Credits

Musicians
 Owen Temple - acoustic
 Phil Madeira - electric guitar, acoustic, pedal steel, Piano, Mandolin, Accordion, Dobro, harmony vocals on "Move Around Money"  
 Mark Robertson - bass  
 Al Perkins - pedal steel
 Fats Kaplin - Fiddle, Mandolin
 Dennis Holt - drums  
 Jake Armerding - harmony vocals on "Accidentally Break My Heart," "No Daring Is Fatal," "Before The Night Becomes The Dawn," "Faith Without Works,"  and "That's Not Something I Could Do"
 Greg Trooper harmony vocals on "Trouble With You," "The Madder You Are (The Cuter You Get)," and "Like We Still Care"  
 Kenny Meeks - harmony vocals on "Burning Too Hot to Last," "Little Sweet Loss," "This Ain't Las Vegas," "For Old Times' Sake," and "Rivers Run From Many Waters"

Production
Produced by Phil Madeira
Engineered by Jordan Richter and Phil Madeira
Recorded at Roswell East, Nashville, Tennessee and at The Mission, Nashville, Tennessee

Artwork
Art Direction/Design by Grafika
Photography by Kim Maguire

Releases

External links 
Owen Temple website
El Paisano Records website

References 

Owen Temple albums
2002 albums